Max Houben (5 May 1898 – 10 February 1949) was a versatile Belgian athlete who competed from the early 1920s until his death at the 1949 FIBT World Championships. He won a silver medal in the four-man bobsled event at the 1948 Winter Olympics in St. Moritz, and was the oldest medalist at the Winter Olympics (48 years, 278 days) until Canadian Russ Howard won a gold medal in men's curling at the 2006 Winter Olympics in Turin (50 years, 7 days).

Athletics career
Houben was national champion in the 100 m. He also made it to the quarterfinals of the 200 m event and the semifinals of the 4 × 100 m relay at the 1920 Summer Olympics. Houben later switched to bobsleigh, in which he competed at the 1928–1948 Winter Olympics, becoming the first Belgian to take part in both Winter and Summer Olympics.

Bobsleigh career
At the Winter Olympics, Houben earned his best finish prior to World War II of fifth in the four-man event at the 1936 Winter Olympics. After the war, he earned two medals at the 1947 FIBT World Championships in St. Moritz with a silver in the four-man and a bronze in the two-man event. He won his only Olympic medal in the four-man event the following year, also in St. Moritz.

Other sports
Houben played association football by Royale Union Saint-Gilloise 1923-1925 and 1926-1929. He also competed in the 24 hours of Francorchamps endurance race in auto racing. He played for CS Verviétois in division one 1919-1923 and 1925-1926, division two in 1931-1936, for Racing CB in 1929-1931, Union SG 1923-1925 and 1926-1929, and played 190 games and scored 40 goals.

Death
Houben died during a practice run at the 1949 FIBT World Championships in Lake Placid, New York, when his two-man sled catapulted off of "shady" corner at the bobsleigh track. Houben was killed instantly, while his partner Jacques Mouvet survived with a broken skull and a serious back injury. The Belgian team withdrew as a result.

Following the accident the community of Lake Placid donated a trophy to the FIBT to be presented to the two-man bobsleigh world champions and named it in honor of Houben.

References

External links

1932 bobsleigh two-man results
1936 bobsleigh two-man results
1936 bobsleigh four-man results
Bobsleigh four-man Olympic medalists for 1924, 1932–56, and since 1964
Bobsleigh two-man world championship medalists since 1931
Bobsleigh four-man world championship medalists since 1930
DatabaseOlympics.com profile
Humo magazine article on Houben – accessed 29 July 2007 
 – Accessed 29 July 2007.
Wallenchinsky, David. (1984). "Bobsled". In The Complete Book the Olympics: 1896–1980. New York: Penguin Books. pp. 558–60.

1898 births
1949 deaths
Belgian male sprinters
Belgian male bobsledders
Belgian footballers
Belgian racing drivers
Olympic athletes of Belgium
Olympic bobsledders of Belgium
Athletes (track and field) at the 1920 Summer Olympics
Bobsledders at the 1928 Winter Olympics
Bobsledders at the 1932 Winter Olympics
Bobsledders at the 1936 Winter Olympics
Bobsledders at the 1948 Winter Olympics
Bobsledders who died while racing
Sports deaths in New York (state)
Olympic medalists in bobsleigh
Medalists at the 1948 Winter Olympics
Olympic silver medalists for Belgium
Association footballers not categorized by position
People from Verviers
Sportspeople from Liège Province